Naila station is a railway station in the municipality of Naila, located in the Hof district in Bavaria, Germany.

References

Railway stations in Bavaria
Buildings and structures in Hof (district)